Charles Tobin (20 October 1919 – 20 May 1996) was an Irish sportsperson. He played hurling with his local club Glen Rovers and was a member of both the Cork and Dublin senior inter-county teams in the 1930s and 1940s.

Playing career

Tobin joined the Glen Rovers senior team in 1937 and won the first of five successive county senior championship titles that year. Renowned as a high goal-scoring forward, he claimed a further two winners' medals in 1944 and 1945.

Having never played at inter-county underage or junior levels, Tobin was drafted onto the Cork senior team during the 1940 Munster Championship. He was dropped from the team the following year before being reinstated in 1942. Tobin claimed a Munster Championship medal that year before lining out at left corner-forward in the All-Ireland final defeat of Dublin.

Personal life and death

Tobin, who was a soldier in the Irish Army, married Brigid Kavanagh in St. Finbarr's South Church on 16 August 1941. The couple had four daughters and fours sons, one of whom died in childhood. The family emigrated to London in the late 1950s.

Charlie Tobin died aged 76 on 20 May 1996.

Honours

Glen Rovers
Cork Senior Hurling Championship (7): 1937, 1938, 1939, 1940, 1941, 1944, 1945

Cork
All-Ireland Senior Hurling Championship (1): 1942
Munster Senior Hurling Championship (1): 1942

References

1919 births
1996 deaths
St Nicholas' Gaelic footballers
Glen Rovers hurlers
Cork inter-county hurlers
All-Ireland Senior Hurling Championship winners